Pro Stock Motorcycle, formerly known as Pro Stock Bike, is a motorcycle drag racing class that is the two-wheeled equivalent of Pro Stock.  It has been a feature of NHRA drag racing since the 1980s when it was added to the professional class structure and has since spread around the globe.  The first points championship season was the 1987 NHRA season. Frames are purpose-built specifically for drag racing and are not based on their road-going counterparts.

One of the most successful Pro Stock Motorcycle drivers in NHRA history was six-time champion Dave Schultz, who died in 2001.  The first female driver in this category is Vicki Farr; the first officially licensed driver is Stephanie Reaves, as well as first to qualify at a NHRA National Event, and the best known female face in this category is Angelle Sampey (Seeling), who set a national record 7.38 second elapsed time in 1996, during her rookie year.

John Myers was one of the most dominant and legendary riders in the sport. He amassed 33 NHRA event wins before his death in 1998.

The category was mostly dominated by Suzuki GS powered machines until the introduction of the Buell and the Harley-Davidson V-Rod. The V-Rod debuted in 2002 and the Buell debuted in 2003.

From 2004 to 2012 the Vance and Hines V-Rod was arguably the most dominant motorcycle in the class. Andrew Hines won three championships and Ed Krawiec won two, utilizing the V-Rod. 

Suzuki and Buell team owner George Bryce was an outspoken critic of the V-Rod's set of rules.

In 2013 the NHRA made a rule change to limit the V-Rods.

Most NHRA Pro Stock Motorcycle wins

See also
Motorcycle drag racing

References 

Motorcycle drag racing